Alexander Bell (20 October 1882 – 30 November 1934) was a footballer who played as a wing half. His professional career was mostly spent in England, where he won trophies with Manchester United and Blackburn Rovers. Born in South Africa, he was largely raised in Scotland and made one appearance for the Scottish national team.

Club career
Born in Cape Town, Cape Colony, to Scottish parents, Bell began his professional football career as a centre-forward with various clubs in Ayr, including Ayr Spring Vale, Ayr Westerlea and Ayr Parkhouse. While with Ayr Parkhouse (then still to join the Scottish Football League), Bell was spotted by former Newton Heath half-back Will Davidson, who reported his findings back to Manchester United.

United paid Ayr Parkhouse £700 for Bell in January 1903. At this stage, it was less than a year since United's formation in place of the bankrupt Newton Heath club, and they were still in the Football League Second Division, from which they won promotion in 1906.

He struggled to make an impact in the Manchester United first team as a centre-forward, making just 11 appearances in his first two years at the club. However, United suffered an injury crisis at half-back in 1904, and Bell was called upon to step in. As it happened, Bell excelled in his new position, and became the club's regular left-half, forming an unbreakable trio with Charlie Roberts and Dick Duckworth.

After scoring 10 goals in 309 appearances, and winning two First Division titles (1907–08 and 1910–11) and one FA Cup (1909), Bell was sold to Blackburn Rovers for a fee of £1,000 in July 1913. He played only a few matches for Blackburn before the outbreak of the First World War, and signed for Clackmannan in 1921. He played there for two seasons and spent one with Royal Albert, before retiring as a player and joining the coaching staff at Coventry City. His last job in football was at Manchester City, where he was employed as coach and trainer from 1925 until his death in November 1934 at the age of 52.

Bell's name was immortalised by former Manchester United teammate Charlie Roberts, who became a tobacconist after retiring from football, naming a brand of cigarette "Ducrobel" after United's famous half-back trio of Duckworth, Roberts and Bell.

International career
On 16 March 1912, Bell played for Scotland in a 4–1 win against Ireland. It was his only international cap and he was the first Manchester United player to represent Scotland.

Honours
Manchester United
Football League First Division: 1907–08, 1910–11
FA Cup: 1909

Blackburn Rovers
Football League First Division: 1913–14

See also
 List of Scotland international footballers born outside Scotland

References

External links

Scotland profile at LondonHearts.com

Sportspeople from Cape Town
Footballers from Ayr
Cape Colony people
Blackburn Rovers F.C. players
Association football wing halves
Association football coaches
Manchester United F.C. players
Scotland international footballers
Scottish footballers
Manchester City F.C. non-playing staff
South African soccer players
South African people of Scottish descent
Ayr Parkhouse F.C. players
Clackmannan F.C. players 
Royal Albert F.C. players
English Football League players
Scottish Football League players
Coventry City F.C. non-playing staff
1882 births
1934 deaths
FA Cup Final players